Léon Louis Vaillant (11 November 1834 – 24 November 1914) was a French zoologist. He is most famous for his work in the areas of herpetology, malacology, and ichthyology.

In 1854 he graduated from the College d'Arras, followed by studies in medicine and zoology in Paris. In 1861, he received his medical doctorate, then continued his zoological studies with Henri Milne-Edwards (1800-1885), earning his degree in natural sciences in 1865. In 1875, he became a professor at the Museum of Natural History in Paris.

He held a special interest involving the systematics and anatomy of turtles and crocodiles, but also made significant contributions in his investigations of reptilian physiology and behavior. Of his 200-plus scientific writings, 90 of them are based on  herpetological subjects.

He participated in French naval expeditions on the Travailleur in 1880, 1881 and 1882 and on the Talisman in 1883.

Eponyms
The following are several species of marine organisms named after Léon Vaillant:
The ribbon worm, Amphiporus vaillanti Joubin, 1902
The dragon fish, Bathophilus vaillanti Zugmayer, 1911
The shortspine African angler, Lophius vaillanti Regan, 1903
The squat lobster, Munidopsis vaillantii A. Milne-Edwards, 1881
Solamen vaillanti Issel, 1869
Solariella vaillanti Dautzenberg & H. Fischer, 1896
Turbonilla vaillanti Dautzenberg & Fischer, 1896.

The following are four species of reptiles named after Vaillant:
Chioninia vaillantii 
Micrelaps vaillanti 
Liophidium vaillanti .
Dopasia ludovici 

The following fish are named after Vaillant: 
The pike cichlid Crenicichla vaillanti Pellegrin, 1904.

The following fish are possibly named after Vaillant:
Pseudogobio vaillanti (Sauvage, 1878)

Written works 
 Études sur les poissons, Mission scientifique au Mexique et dans l'Amérique centrale - Study of fishes. (with Marie Firmin Bocourt 1819-1904).
 Essai sur le système pileux dans l'espèce humaine, 1861, medical dissertation.
 Observations sur la constitution géologique de quelques terrains aux environs de Suez, 1865 - Observations on the geological constitution of terrain and environs of Suez.
 Recherches sur la famille des Tridacnides, 1865 - Research of the family Tridacninae.
 Note sur quelques objets océaniens empruntés au test de différents mollusques, 1868, Bulletin de la société géologique de France. - Note on a few items from the Pacific borrowed in order to test different mollusks.
 Quelques mots sur Denys de Montfort à propos d'une brochure parue en 1815, sd Rapport sur les poissons, crustacés et mollusques, 1880, Exposition universelle de 1878, à Paris - Some comments by Pierre Denys de Montfort (1815), Report on fishes, crustaceans and mollusks.
 Mémoire sur la disposition des vertèbrés cervicales chez les chéloniens 1880 - Memoir on the disposition of cervical vertebrae of chelonians.
 Expéditions scientifiques du travailleur et du Talisman pendant les annees 1880, 1881, 1882, 1883. Poissons, 1888 - Scientific expeditions of the Travailleur and the Talisman during the years 1880 to 1883.
 Histoire naturelle des annelés marins et d'eau douce, 1889-1890, Collection des Suites à Buffon - Natural history of marine and freshwater annelids; (with Jean Louis Armand de Quatrefages de Bréau 1810-1892). 
 Les tortues éteintes de l'île Rodriguez d'après les pièces conservées dans les galeries du Muséum, 1893 - Turles off of Rodrigues, in reference to conserved pieces in the museum galleries. 
 Histoire naturelle des reptiles. Première partie: Crocodiles et tortues, 1910 - Natural history of reptiles. first part: crocodiles and turtles.

See also
:Category:Taxa named by Léon Vaillant

References

External links
WorldCat Identities (publications)
VIAF

French herpetologists
French ichthyologists
1834 births
1914 deaths
French physiologists
National Museum of Natural History (France) people
Scientists from Paris